The 2006–07 season was JS Kabylie's 42nd season in the Algerian top flight, They competed in National 1, the Algerian Cup, and Super Cup and the Champions League.

Squad list
Players and squad numbers last updated on 25 September 2006.Note: Flags indicate national team as has been defined under FIFA eligibility rules. Players may hold more than one non-FIFA nationality.

Competitions

Overview

{| class="wikitable" style="text-align: center"
|-
!rowspan=2|Competition
!colspan=8|Record
!rowspan=2|Started round
!rowspan=2|Final position / round
!rowspan=2|First match
!rowspan=2|Last match
|-
!
!
!
!
!
!
!
!
|-
| National 1

| 
| style="background:silver;"| Runners-up
| 10 August 2006
| 11 June 2007
|-
| Algerian Cup

| Round of 64
| Semi-finals
| 5 February 2007
| 15 June 2007
|-
| Super Cup

| Final
| style="background:silver;"| Runners–up
| colspan=3| 1 November 2006
|-
| 2006 Champions League

| colspan=2| Group stage
| 16 July 2006
| 17 September 2006
|-
| 2007 Champions League

| Preliminary round
| Group stage
| 26 January 2007
| 6 July 2007
|-
! Total

National 1

League table

Results summary

Results by round

Matches

Algerian Cup

Algerian Super Cup

2006 Champions League

Group stage

Group A

2007 Champions League

Preliminary round

First round

Second round

Group stage

Group A

Squad information

Playing statistics

|-

|-
! colspan=14 style=background:#dcdcdc; text-align:center| Players transferred out during the season

Goalscorers
Includes all competitive matches. The list is sorted alphabetically by surname when total goals are equal.

Transfers

In

Out

Notes

References

JS Kabylie seasons
JS Kabylie